The 2013–14 UNC Greensboro Spartans men's basketball team represented the University of North Carolina at Greensboro during the 2013–14 NCAA Division I men's basketball season. The Spartans, led by third year head coach Wes Miller, played their home games at the Greensboro Coliseum and were members of the Southern Conference. They finished the season 14–18, 7–9 in SoCon play to finish in sixth place. They lost in the first round of the SoCon tournament to The Citadel.

Roster

Schedule

|-
!colspan=9 style="background:#003366; color:#FFCC00;"| Exhibition

|-
!colspan=9 style="background:#003366; color:#FFCC00;"| Regular season

|-
!colspan=9 style="background:#003366; color:#FFCC00;"| 2014 SoCon tournament

References

UNC Greensboro Spartans men's basketball seasons
UNC Greensboro
2013 in sports in North Carolina
2014 in sports in North Carolina